The Type 053H3 (NATO reporting name: Jiangwei II) is a class of Chinese frigates that entered service with the People's Liberation Army Navy Surface Force in the 1990s and 2000s. The class comprised 10 vessels, all of which remain in active service. Two of them are sold to the Bangladesh Navy. They were a follow-on of the Type 053H2G (Jiangwei I) class. The  used by the Pakistan Navy was based on the Type 053H3.

History
In the 1980s, the PLAN ordered Shanghai-based Hudong Shipyard (now Hudong–Zhonghua Shipyard) to build a replacement for the Type 053K air defence frigate. The new class was based on the Type 053H2 frigate and designated Type 053H2G. Development was carried out under Project 055.

The Type 053H2G was slightly larger than the Type 053H2, and equipped with HQ-61B surface-to-air missiles (SAM). However, the HQ-61 proved unsatisfactory and the class was quickly superseded by the Type 053H3 which was an improved Type 053H2G equipped with HQ-7 SAMs. The HQ-7 was a Chinese-produced version of the French R330 Sea Crotale. Ten Type 053H3s were produced between 1996 and 2005.

The most obvious visual distinction between Jiangwei I & II are: The Jiangwei II's have HQ-7 instead of HQ-61B SAMs, 8 C-802 anti-ship missiles instead of 6, and aft AAA mounts elevated compared to the Jiangwei I. The Jiangwei II class was briefly equipped with HQ-61B SAM system before being replaced by HQ-7 during upgrade, and some sources claim that the upgraded version is also called Type 057.

Mid-life upgrade
A limited, mid-life upgrade was observed for the 053H3 starting in 2015. Visible difference include the replacement of the ESM/EW suite/radars to similar systems from the Type 054, replacement of the HQ-7 with the HHQ-10 short range air defense missile and replacement of the 4 × Type 76A 37 mm guns with a new 2 × Type 630 30 mm CIWS similar to the Gryazev-Shipunov AO-18K.

Ships in class

See also
 List of naval ship classes in service

References

External links

 Sino Defense Today

 
Frigate classes